Voice of America (VOA or VoA) is the state-owned news network and international radio broadcaster of the United States of America. It is the largest and oldest U.S.-funded international broadcaster. VOA produces digital, TV, and radio content in 48 languages, which it distributes to affiliate stations around the world. Its targeted and primary audience is non-American.

VOA was established in 1942, and the VOA charter (Public Laws 94-350 and 103–415) was signed into law in 1976 by President Gerald Ford.

VOA is headquartered in Washington, D.C., and overseen by the U.S. Agency for Global Media (USAGM), an independent agency of the U.S. government. Funds are appropriated annually under the budget for embassies and consulates. As of 2022, VOA has a weekly worldwide audience of approximately 326 million (up from 236.6 million in 2016) and employs 961 staff with annual budget of $252 million.

Voice of America is seen by many listeners as having a positive impact, it also serves US diplomacy.

Current languages

The Voice of America website had five English language broadcasts as of 2014 (worldwide, Learning English, Cambodia, Zimbabwe and Tibet). Additionally, the VOA website has versions in 47 foreign languages (radio programs are marked with an "R"; TV programs with a "T"):

 Afan Oromo 
 Albanian 
 Amharic 
 Armenian 
 Azerbaijani 
 Bambara 
 Bangla 
 Bosnian 
 Burmese 
 Cantonese 
 Mandarin 
 Dari Persian 
 French 
 Georgian 
 Haitian Creole 
 Hausa 
 Indonesian 
 Khmer 
 Kinyarwanda 
 Kirundi 
 Korean 
 Kurdish 
 Lao 
 Lingala 
 Macedonian 
 Ndebele 
 Pashto 
 Persian 
 Portuguese 
 Rohingya 
 Russian 
 Sango 
 Serbian 
 Shona 
 Sindhi
 Somali 
 Spanish 
 Swahili 
 Tagalog 
 Thai 
 Tibetan 
 Tigrinya 
 Turkish 
 Ukrainian 
 Urdu 
 Uzbek 
 Vietnamese 
 Wolof
 English 

The number of languages varies according to the priorities of the United States government and the world situation.

History

American private shortwave broadcasting before World War II
Before World War II, all American shortwave stations were in private hands. Privately controlled shortwave networks included the National Broadcasting Company's International Network (or White Network), which broadcast in six languages, the Columbia Broadcasting System's Latin American international network, which consisted of 64 stations located in 18 countries, the Crosley Broadcasting Corporation in Cincinnati, Ohio, and General Electric which owned and operated WGEO and WGEA, both based in Schenectady, New York, and KGEI in San Francisco, all of which had shortwave transmitters. Experimental programming began in the 1930s, but there were fewer than 12 transmitters in operation. In 1939, the Federal Communications Commission set the following policy:

A licensee of an international broadcast station shall render only an international broadcast service which will reflect the culture of this country and which will promote international goodwill, understanding and cooperation. Any program solely intended for, and directed to an audience in the continental United States does not meet the requirements for this service.

This policy was intended to enforce the State Department's Good Neighbor Policy, but some broadcasters felt that it was an attempt to direct censorship.

Shortwave signals to Latin America were regarded as vital to counter Nazi propaganda around 1940. Initially, the Office of Coordination of Information sent releases to each station, but this was seen as an inefficient means of transmitting news. The director of Latin American relations at the Columbia Broadcasting System was Edmund A. Chester, and he supervised the development of CBS's extensive "La Cadena de las Americas" radio network to improve broadcasting to South America during the 1940s.

Also included among the cultural diplomacy programming on the Columbia Broadcasting System was the musical show Viva America (1942-1949) which featured the Pan American Orchestra and the artistry of several noted musicians from both North and South America, including Alfredo Antonini, Juan Arvizu, Eva Garza, Elsa Miranda, Nestor Mesta Chaires, Miguel Sandoval, John Serry Sr., and Terig Tucci. By 1945, broadcasts of the show were carried by 114 stations on CBS's "La Cadena de las Americas" network in 20 Latin American nations. These broadcasts proved to be highly successful in supporting President Franklin Roosevelt's policy of Pan-Americanism throughout South America during World War II.

World War II
Even before the Japanese attack on Pearl Harbor, the U.S. government's Office of the Coordinator of Information (COI) had already begun providing war news and commentary to the commercial American shortwave radio stations for use on a voluntary basis through its Foreign Information Service (FIS) headed by playwright Robert E. Sherwood, who served as president Roosevelt's speech writer and information advisor. Direct programming began a week after the United States’ entry into World War II in December 1941, with the first broadcast from the San Francisco office of the FIS via General Electric's KGEI transmitting to the Philippines in English (other languages followed). The next step was to broadcast to Germany, which was called Stimmen aus Amerika ("Voices from America") and was transmitted on February 1, 1942. It was introduced by "The Battle Hymn of the Republic" and included the pledge: "Today, and every day from now on, we will be with you from America to talk about the war... The news may be good or bad for us – We will always tell you the truth." Roosevelt approved this broadcast, which then-Colonel William J. Donovan (COI) and Sherwood (FIS) had recommended to him. It was Sherwood who actually coined the term "The Voice of America" to describe the shortwave network that began its transmissions on February 1, from 270 Madison Avenue in New York City.

The Office of War Information, when organized in the middle of 1942, officially took over VOA's operations. VOA reached an agreement with the British Broadcasting Corporation to share medium-wave transmitters in Britain, and expanded into Tunis in North Africa and Palermo and Bari, Italy, as the Allies captured these territories. The OWI also set up the American Broadcasting Station in Europe. Asian transmissions started with one transmitter in California in 1941; services were expanded by adding transmitters in Hawaii and, after recapture, the Philippines.

By the end of the war, VOA had 39 transmitters and provided service in 40 languages. Programming was broadcast from production centers in New York and San Francisco, with more than 1,000 programs originating from New York. Programming consisted of music, news, commentary, and relays of U.S. domestic programming, in addition to specialized VOA programming.

About half of VOA's services, including the Arabic service, were discontinued in 1945. In late 1945, VOA was transferred to the Department of State.

Cold War
The VOA ramped up its operations during the Cold War, which also increased its influence. Foy Kohler, the director of VOA during the Cold War, strongly believed that the VOA was serving its purpose, which he identified as aiding in the fight against communism. He argued that the numbers of listeners they were getting such as 194,000 regular listeners in Sweden, and 2.1 million regular listeners in France, was an indication of a positive impact. As further evidence, he noted that the VOA received 30,000 letters a month from listeners all over the world, and hundreds of thousands of requests for broadcasting schedules. There was an analysis done of some of those letters sent in 1952 and 1953 while Kohler was still director. The study found that letter writing could be an indicator of successful, actionable persuasion. It was also found that broadcasts in different countries were having different effects. In one country, regular listeners adopted and practiced American values presented by the broadcast. Age was also a factor: younger and older audiences tended to like different types of programs no matter the country. Kohler used all of this as evidence to claim that the VOA helped to grow and strengthen the free world. It also influenced the UN in their decision to condemn communist actions in Korea, and was a major factor in the decline of communism in the "free world, including key countries such as Italy and France. In Italy, the VOA did not just bring an end to communism, but it caused the country to Americanize. The VOA also had an impact behind the Iron Curtain. Practically all defectors during Kohler's time claimed the VOA helped in their decision to defect. Another indication of impact, according to Kohler, was the Soviet response. Kohler argued that the Soviets responded because the VOA was having an impact. Based on Soviet responses, it can be presumed that the most effective programs were ones that compared the lives of those behind and outside the iron curtain, questions on the practice of slave labor, as well as lies and errors in Stalin's version of Marxism.

In 1947, VOA started broadcasting to the Soviet citizens in Russia under the pretext of countering "more harmful instances of Soviet propaganda directed against American leaders and policies" on the part of the internal Soviet Russian-language media, according to John B. Whitton's treatise, Cold War Propaganda. The Soviet Union responded by initiating electronic jamming of VOA broadcasts on April 24, 1949.

Charles W. Thayer headed VOA in 1948–49. Over the next few years, the U.S. government debated the best role of Voice of America. The decision was made to use VOA broadcasts as a part of its foreign policy to fight the propaganda of the Soviet Union and other countries.

The Arabic service resumed on January 1, 1950, with a half-hour program. This program grew to 14.5 hours daily during the Suez Crisis of 1956, and was six hours a day by 1958. Between 1952 and 1960, Voice of America used a converted U.S. Coast Guard cutter Courier as a first mobile broadcasting ship.

Control of VOA passed from the State Department to the U.S. Information Agency when the latter was established in 1953 to transmit worldwide, including to the countries behind the Iron Curtain and to the People's Republic of China. From 1955 until 2003, VOA broadcast American jazz on the Voice of America Jazz Hour. Hosted for most of that period by Willis Conover, the program had 30 million listeners at its peak. A program aimed at South Africa in 1956 broadcast two hours nightly, and special programs such as The Newport Jazz Festival were also transmitted. This was done in association with tours by U.S. musicians, such as Dizzy Gillespie, Louis Armstrong, and Duke Ellington, sponsored by the State Department. From August 1952 through May 1953, Billy Brown, a high school senior in Westchester County, New York, had a Monday night program in which he shared everyday happenings in Yorktown Heights, New York. Brown's program ended due to its popularity: his "chatty narratives" attracted so much fan mail, VOA couldn't afford the $500 a month in clerical and postage costs required to respond to listeners' letters. During 1953, VOA personnel were subjected to McCarthyist policies, where VOA was accused by Senator Joseph McCarthy, Roy Cohn, and Gerard David Schine of intentionally planning to build weak transmitting stations to sabotage VOA broadcasts. However, the charges were dropped after one month of court hearings in February and March 1953.

Somewhere around 1954, VOA's headquarters were moved from New York to Washington D.C. The arrival of cheap, low-cost transistors enabled the significant growth of shortwave radio listeners. During the Hungarian Revolution of 1956, VOA's broadcasts were deemed controversial, as Hungarian refugees and revolutionaries thought that VOA served as a medium and insinuated the possible arrival of the Western aid.

Throughout the Cold War, many of the targeted countries' governments sponsored jamming of VOA broadcasts, which sometimes led critics to question the broadcasts' actual impact. For example, in 1956, Polish People's Republic stopped jamming VOA transmissions, but People's Republic of Bulgaria continued to jam the signal through the 1970s. Chinese language VOA broadcasts were jammed beginning in 1956 and extending through 1976. However, after the collapse of the Warsaw Pact and the Soviet Union, interviews with participants in anti-Soviet movements verified the effectiveness of VOA broadcasts in transmitting information to socialist societies. The People's Republic of China diligently jams VOA broadcasts. Cuba has also been reported to interfere with VOA satellite transmissions to Iran from its Russian-built transmission site at Bejucal. David Jackson, former director of Voice of America, noted: "The North Korean government doesn't jam us, but they try to keep people from listening through intimidation or worse. But people figure out ways to listen despite the odds. They're very resourceful."

Throughout the 1960s and 1970s, VOA covered some of the era's most important news, including Martin Luther King Jr.'s 1963 "I Have a Dream" speech and Neil Armstrong's 1969 first walk on the Moon, which drew an audience estimated at between 615 and 750 million people. In 1973, due to the detente policies in the Cold War, Soviet jamming of the VOA ceased.

In the early 1980s, VOA began a $1.3 billion rebuilding program to improve broadcast with better technical capabilities. During the implementation of the Martial law in Poland between 1981 and 1983, VOA's Polish broadcasts expanded to seven hours daily. Throughout the 1980s, VOA focused on covering events from the 'American hinterland', such as 150th anniversary of the Oregon Trail. Also in the 1980s, VOA also added a television service, as well as special regional programs to Cuba, Radio Martí and TV Martí. Cuba has consistently attempted to jam such broadcasts and has vociferously protested U.S. broadcasts directed at Cuba. In September 1980, VOA started broadcasting to Afghanistan in Dari and in Pashto in 1982. In 1985, VOA Europe was created as a special service in English that was relayed via satellite to AM, FM, and cable affiliates throughout Europe. With a contemporary format including live disc jockeys, the network presented top musical hits as well as VOA news and features of local interest (such as "EuroFax") 24 hours a day. VOA Europe was closed down without advance public notice in January 1997 as a cost-cutting measure. It was followed by VOA Express, which from July 4, 1999, revamped into VOA Music Mix. Since November 1, 2014, stations are offered VOA1 (which is a rebranding of VOA Music Mix).

In 1989, Voice of America expanded its Mandarin and Cantonese programming to reach the millions of Chinese and inform the country about the pro-democracy movement within the country, including the demonstration in Tiananmen Square. Starting in 1990, the U.S. consolidated its international broadcasting efforts, with the establishment of the Bureau of Broadcasting.

Post–Cold War
With the breakup of the Soviet bloc in Eastern Europe, VOA added many additional language services to reach those areas. This decade was marked by the additions of Standard Tibetan, Kurdish (to Iran and Iraq), Serbo-Croatian (Croatian, Serbian, Bosnian), Macedonian, and Rwanda-Rundi language services.

In 1993, the Clinton administration advised cutting funding for Radio Free Europe/Radio Liberty as it was felt post-Cold War information and influence was not needed in Europe. This plan was not well received, and he then proposed the compromise of the International Broadcasting Act. The Broadcasting Board of Governors was established and took control from the Board for International Broadcasters which previously oversaw funding for RFE/RL.

In 1994, President Bill Clinton signed the International Broadcasting Act into law. This law established the International Broadcasting Bureau as a part of the U.S. Information Agency and created the Broadcasting Board of Governors with oversight authority. In 1998, the Foreign Affairs Reform and Restructuring Act was signed into law and mandated that the Broadcasting Board of Governors, or BBG, become an independent federal agency as of October 1, 1999. This act also abolished the United States Information Agency (USIA) and merged most of its functions with those of the State Department.

In 1994, Voice of America became the first broadcast-news organization to offer continuously updated programs on the Internet.

Cuts in services 
The Arabic Service was abolished in 2002 and replaced by a new radio service, called the Middle East Radio Network or Radio Sawa, with an initial budget of $22 million. Radio Sawa offered mostly Western and Middle Eastern popular songs with periodic brief news bulletins. Today, the network has expanded to television with Alhurra and to various social media and websites.

On May 16, 2004, Worldnet, a satellite television service, was merged into the VOA network.

Radio programs in Russian ended in July 2008. In September 2008, VOA eliminated the Hindi-language service after 53 years. Broadcasts in Ukrainian, Serbian, Macedonian and Bosnian also ended. These reductions were part of American efforts to concentrate more resources to broadcast to the Muslim world.

In September 2010, VOA began its radio broadcasts in Sudan. As U.S. interests in South Sudan have grown, there is a desire to provide people with free information.

In 2013, VOA ended foreign language transmissions on shortwave and medium wave to Albania, Georgia, Iran and Latin America, as well as English-language broadcasts to the Middle East and Afghanistan. The movement was done due to budget cuts.

On July 1, 2014, VOA cut most of its English-language shortwave transmissions to Asia, as well as shortwave transmissions in Azerbaijani, Bengali, Khmer, Kurdish, Lao, and Uzbek. The following month, the Greek service ended after 72 years on air.

List of languages

List of directors 
   1941–1942 Robert E. Sherwood (Foreign Information Service)

 1942–1943 John Houseman
 1943–1945 Louis G. Cowan
 1945–1946 John Ogilvie
 1948–1949 Charles W. Thayer
 1949–1952 Foy D. Kohler
 1952–1953 Alfred H. Morton
 1953–1954 Leonard Erikson
 1954–1956 John R. Poppele
 1956–1958 Robert E. Burton
 1958–1965 Henry Loomis
 1965–1967 John Chancellor
 1967–1968 John Charles Daly
 1969–1977 Kenneth R. Giddens
 1977–1979 R. Peter Straus
 1980–1981 Mary G. F. Bitterman
 1981–1982 James B. Conkling
 1982 John Hughes
 1982–1984 Kenneth Tomlinson
 1985 Gene Pell
 1986–1991 Dick Carlson
 1991–1993 Chase Untermeyer
 1994–1996 Geoffrey Cowan
 1997–1999 Evelyn S. Lieberman
 1999–2001 Sanford J. Ungar
 2001–2002 Robert R. Reilly
 2002–2006 David S. Jackson
 2006–2011 Danforth W. Austin
 2011–2015 David Ensor
 2016–2020 Amanda Bennett
 2020–2021 Robert R. Reilly
 2021–present (vacant)

Agencies
Voice of America has been a part of several agencies. From its founding in 1942 to 1945, it was part of the Office of War Information, and then from 1945 to 1953 as a function of the State Department. VOA was placed under the U.S. Information Agency in 1953. When the USIA was abolished in 1999, VOA was placed under the BBG which is an autonomous U.S. government agency, with bipartisan membership. The Secretary of State has a seat on the BBG. The BBG was established as a buffer to protect VOA and other U.S.-sponsored, non-military, international broadcasters from political interference. It replaced the Board for International Broadcasting (BIB) that oversaw the funding and operation of Radio Free Europe/Radio Liberty, a branch of VOA.

52 Documentary 
In 2021, Voice of America launched 52 Documentary, a series that publishes weekly films about human experiences. They publish on the streaming app, VOA+, and YouTube. Films average 10–15 minutes and are translated with captions in several languages, including Russian, Persian, Mandarin, Urdu, and English. Euna Lee directs the program.

Laws

Smith–Mundt Act
From 1948 until its amendment in 2013, Voice of America was forbidden to broadcast directly to American citizens under § 501 of the Smith–Mundt Act. The act was amended as a result of the passing of the Smith-Mundt Modernization Act provision of the National Defense Authorization Act for 2013. The intent of the legislation in 1948 was to protect the American public from propaganda actions by their own government and to have no competition with private American companies. The amendment had the intent of adapting to the Internet and allow American citizens to request access to VOA content.

Internal policies

VOA charter
Under the Eisenhower administration in 1959, VOA Director Henry Loomis commissioned a formal statement of principles to protect the integrity of VOA programming and define the organization's mission, and was issued by Director George V. Allen as a directive in 1960 and was endorsed in 1962 by USIA director Edward R. Murrow. The principles were signed into law on July 12, 1976, by President Gerald Ford. It reads:
The long-range interests of the United States are served by communicating directly with the peoples of the world by radio. To be effective, the Voice of America must win the attention and respect of listeners. These principles will therefore govern Voice of America (VOA) broadcasts. 1. VOA will serve as a consistently reliable and authoritative source of news. VOA news will be accurate, objective, and comprehensive. 2. VOA will represent America, not any single segment of American society, and will therefore present a balanced and comprehensive projection of significant American thought and institutions. 3. VOA will present the policies of the United States clearly and effectively, and will also present responsible discussions and opinion on these policies.

"Firewall"
The Voice of America Firewall was put in place with the 1976 VOA Charter and laws passed in 1994 and 2016 as a way of ensuring the integrity of VOA's journalism. This policy fights against propaganda and promotes unbiased and objective journalistic standards in the agency. The charter is one part of this firewall and the other laws assist in ensuring high standards of journalism.

"Two-source rule"
According to former VOA correspondent Alan Heil, the internal policy of VOA News is that any story broadcast must have two independently corroborating sources or have a staff correspondent witness an event.

Censorship 
On 30 June 2022, VOA Turkish's domain name "amerikaninsesi.com" was blocked in Turkey upon the request of the Radio and Television Supreme Council (RTÜK). RTÜK had already ordered VOA in February 2022 to pay a license fee or to terminate their service in Turkey. In order to circumvent censorship, they moved to "voaturkce.com" domain name.

VOA Radiogram
VOA Radiogram was an experimental Voice of America program starting in March 2013 which transmitted digital text and images via shortwave radiograms. There were 220 editions of the program, transmitted each weekend from the Edward R. Murrow transmitting station. The audio tones that comprised the bulk of each 30 minute program were transmitted via an analog transmitter, and could be decoded using a basic AM shortwave receiver with freely downloadable software of the Fldigi family. This software is available for Windows, Apple (macOS), Linux, and FreeBSD systems.

Broadcasts can also be decoded using the free TIVAR app from the Google Play store using any Android device.

The mode used most often on VOA Radiogram, for both text and images, was MFSK32, but other modes were also occasionally transmitted.

The final edition of VOA Radiogram was transmitted during the weekend of June 17–18, 2017, a week before the retirement of the program producer from VOA. An offer to continue the broadcasts on a contract basis was declined, so a follow-on show called Shortwave Radiogram began transmission on June 25, 2017, from the WRMI transmitting site in Okeechobee, Florida.

Shortwave Radiogram program schedule

Transmission facilities
The Bethany Relay Station, operational from 1944 to 1994, was based on a  site in Union Township (now West Chester Township) in Butler County, Ohio, near Cincinnati. The site is now a recreational park with a lake, lodge, dog park, and Voice of America museum. Major transmitter upgrades first happened around 1963, when shortwave and medium-wave transmitters were built, upgraded or rebuilt. Other former sites include California (Dixon and Delano), Hawaii, Okinawa, Liberia (Monrovia), Costa Rica, Belize, and at least two in Greece (Kavala and Rhodos).

Between 1983 and 1990, VOA made significant upgrades to transmission facilities in Botswana (Selebi-Phikwe), Morocco, Thailand (Udon Thani), Kuwait, and Sao Tome (Almas). Some of them are shared with Radio Liberty and Radio Free Asia.

Currently, VOA and USAGM continue to operate shortwave radio transmitters and antenna farms at International Broadcasting Bureau Greenville Transmitting Station (known as "Site B") in the United States, close to Greenville, North Carolina. They do not use FCC-issued call signs, since the FCC does not regulate communications by other federal government agencies. (The FCC regulates broadcasting by private companies and other businesses, state governments, nonprofit organizations [NPOs] and non-government organizations [NGOs], and private individuals.) The IBB also operates transmission facilities on São Tomé and Tinang, Concepcion, Tarlac, Philippines for VOA.

Controversies

Abdul Malik Rigi interview
On April 2, 2007, Abdul Malik Rigi, the leader of Jundullah, a militant group with possible links to al-Qaeda, appeared on Voice of America's Persian language service. The interview resulted in public condemnation by the Iranian-American community, as well as the Iranian government. Jundullah is a militant organization that has been linked to numerous attacks on civilians, such as the 2009 Zahedan bombing.

Tibetan protester interview
In February 2013, a documentary released by China Central Television interviewed a Tibetan self-immolator who failed to kill himself. The interviewee said he was motivated by Voice of America's broadcasts of commemorations of people who committed suicide in political self-immolation. VOA denied any allegations of instigating self-immolations and demanded that the Chinese station retract its report.

Trump presidency politicization efforts

After the inauguration of US President Donald Trump, several tweets by Voice of America (one of which was later removed) seemed to support the widely criticized statements by White House press secretary Sean Spicer about the crowd size and biased media coverage. This first raised concerns over possible attempts by Trump to politicize the state-funded agency. This amplified already growing propaganda concerns over the provisions in the National Defense Authorization Act for Fiscal Year 2017, signed into law by Barack Obama, which replaced the board of the Broadcasting Board of Governors with a CEO appointed by the president. Trump sent two of his political aides, Matthew Ciepielowski and Matthew Schuck, to the agency to aid its current CEO during the transition to the Trump administration. Criticism was raised over Trump's choice of aides; Schuck was a staff writer for right-wing website The Daily Surge until April 2015, while Ciepielowski was a field director at the conservative advocacy group Americans for Prosperity. VOA officials responded with assurances that they would not become "Trump TV". BBG head John F. Lansing told NPR that it would be illegal for the administration to tell VOA what to broadcast, while VOA director Amanda Bennett stressed that while "government-funded", the agency is not "government-run".

On April 10, 2020, the White House published an article in its daily newsletter critical of VOA coverage of the coronavirus pandemic. Emails revealed in a Freedom of Information Act request showed Centers for Disease Control and Prevention (CDC) press official Michawn Rich had sent a memo to agency employees stating in part, "as a rule, do not send up [interview] requests for Greta Van Susteren or anyone affiliated with Voice of America," referencing the White House story. On April 30, The Washington Post reported Vice President Mike Pence's office "threatened to retaliate against a reporter who revealed that Pence's office had told journalists they would need masks for Pence's visit to the Mayo Clinic — a requirement Pence himself did not follow."

On June 3, 2020, the Senate confirmed Michael Pack, a maker of conservative documentaries and close ally of Steve Bannon, to serve as head of the United States Agency for Global Media, which oversees VOA. Subsequently, Director Bennet and deputy director Sandy Sugawara resigned from VOA. CNN reported on June 16 that plans for a leadership shakeup at VOA were being discussed, including the possibility that controversial former White House aide Sebastian Gorka would be given a leadership role at VOA. On June 17, the heads of VOA's Middle East Broadcasting, Radio Free Asia, Radio Free Europe/Radio Liberty and the Open Technology Fund were all fired, their boards were dissolved and external communications from VOA employees made to require approval from senior agency personnel in what one source described as an "unprecedented" move, while Jeffrey Shapiro, like Pack a Bannon ally, was rumored to be in line to head the Office of Cuba Broadcasting. Four former members of the advisory boards subsequently filed suit challenging Pack's standing to fire them. On July 9, NPR reported VOA would not renew the work visas of dozens of non-resident reporters, many of whom could face repercussions in their home countries. In late July, four contractors and the head of VOA's Urdu language service were suspended after a video featuring extensive clips from a Muslim-American voter conference, including a campaign message from then-Democratic presidential candidate Joe Biden, was determined not to meet editorial standards and taken down.

On August 12, 2020, USAGM chief financial officer Grant Turner and general counsel David Kligerman were removed from their positions and stripped of their security clearances, reportedly for their opposition to what Turner called "gross mismanagement," along with four other senior agency officials. Politico reported on August 13 that Trump administration official and former shock jock Frank Wuco had been hired as a USAGM senior advisor, responsible for auditing the agency's office of policy and research. As a radio host, Wuco issued insults and groundless claims against former US President Barack Obama, CIA Director John O. Brennan and Speaker of the House Nancy Pelosi. VOA's Twitter account during this period featured stories favorable to Vice President Mike Pence and White House advisor Ivanka Trump.

In response to Pack's August 27 interview with The Federalist website, a group of VOA journalists sent a letter to VOA Acting Director Elez Biberaj complaining that his "comments and decisions 'endanger the personal security of VOA reporters at home and abroad, as well as threatening to harm U.S. national security objectives.'" VOA's response was that "it would not respond directly to the letter because it was 'improper' and 'failed to follow procedure.' Instead, the leadership of USAGM and VOA 'are handling the choice of complaint transmission as an administrative issue,' which suggested that the journalists could face sanctions for their letter," according to The Washington Post. In the same story, the Post reported that VOA Spanish-language service White House correspondent's Brigo Segovia's interview with an official about the administration's response to Pack's personnel and other moves had been censored and his own access to VOA's computer system restricted.

On July 20, 2020, District of Columbia Attorney General Karl A. Racine filed suit under the District's Nonprofit Corporations Act to reverse Pack's replacement of the Open Technology Fund (OTF) board. Beginning in August 2020, OTF came under increasing pressure from Peck and USAGM leadership. According to Axios, this was related to OTF's reluctance to extend grants to Falun Gong-related enterprises working on technology directed against China's Great Firewall; The New York Times noted Falun Gong and its Epoch Times media group frequently supported the Trump administration. On August 18, USAGM announced it was setting up its own Office of Internet Freedom with less strict grant requirements and began soliciting OTF's grantees to apply to the new office. On August 20, OTF sued USAGM in the US Court for Federal Claims for withholding nearly $20 million in previously-agreed grant funds. On October 15, summary judgment was granted nullifying Pack's attempt to replace the OTF board.

On September 29, six senior USAGM officials filed a whistleblower complaint in which they alleged that Pack or one of his aides had ordered research conducted into the voting history of at least one agency employee, which would be a violation of laws protecting civil servants from undue political influence. NPR reported that two Pack aides had compiled a report on VOA White House bureau chief Steven L. Herman's social media postings and other writings in an attempt to charge him with a conflict of interest, and that the agency released a conflict of interest policy stating in part that a "journalist who on Facebook 'likes' a comment or political cartoon that aggressively attacks or disparages the President must recuse themselves from covering the President." A preliminary injunction issued on November 20 barred Pack "from making personnel decisions involving journalists at the networks; from directly communicating with editors and journalists employed by them; and from investigating any editors or news stories produced by them" and characterized the investigation of Herman as an "unconstitutional prior restraint" of his, his editors' and fellow journalists' free speech.

Suspended officials from Voice of America sued the agency news outlet on October 8. They accused its chief operating officer, Michael Pack, of using Voice of America as a vehicle to promote the personal agenda of President Trump and of violating a statutory firewall intended to prevent political interference with the agency, and they are seeking their reinstatement.

Then-Democratic presidential candidate Joe Biden's campaign told Vox News in June 2020 that Biden would fire Pack if he won election. In November 2020, US District Judge Beryl Howell found Pack violated the First Amendment rights of Voice of America journalists.

In December 2020, the Washington Post reported Pack was refusing to cooperate with President-elect Biden's transition team and, in an end run around the court order, had persuaded VOA Acting Director Biberaj to step down, replacing him with Robert Reilly, a former VOA director who had written critically of Muslims, gays and lesbians. On December 19, 33 days before President-elect Biden's inauguration, Pack named Ted Lipien, a former VOA veteran journalist who headed the Polish Service during the final struggle for democracy in Poland in the 1980s and a former acting associate director of VOA who, according to NPR, "became a sharp critic of USAGM, VOA and the other affiliated networks on a pair of blogs" and "of the three network presidents affected, the only one without established partisan ties," – as head of RFE/RL, and Jeffrey Scott Shapiro, a writer for Breitbart and The Washington Times who had claimed President Obama "hates America," as head of the Office of Cuba Broadcasting. On December 30, NPR reported Pack was attempting to add contractual language that would make it impossible to fire the broadcasting board members he had installed for two years, after which they could only be fired "for cause." Reportedly the new contracts had been withdrawn after inquiries from media and Congress.

On January 11, 2021, VOA interim director Reilly ordered veteran reporter Patsy Widakuswara off the White House beat. Earlier that day, Widakuswara had followed US Secretary of State Mike Pompeo out of the building after his speech criticizing the VOA and his VOA-sponsored interview with VOA Director Robert Reilly during which reporters were not allowed to ask questions. Widakuswara asked Pompeo what he was doing to repair the international reputation of the U.S. and whether he regretted saying there would be a second Trump administration. The theme of the preceding interview with VOA Director Robert Reilly was reportedly the dangers of censorship. In response, dozens of VOA journalists, including Widakuswara, wrote and circulated a petition calling on Reilly and public affairs specialist Elizabeth Robbins to resign. In a statement, U.S. House Foreign Affairs Committee Chairman Gregory Meeks and ranking member Michael McCaul said, "Absent a legitimate reason for this move, which has not been provided, we believe she should be reinstated". Widakuswara was reinstated to the White House beat after President Biden requested the resignation of Michael Pack.

On January 19, the Government Accountability Project, representing fired USAGM employees and whistleblowers, sent a letter to the Congressional foreign affairs committees, the U.S. Office of Special Counsel and the Inspector General of the US Department of State. The letter reported that Pack had hired the McGuireWoods law firm to investigate USAGM employees and the OTF at a cost of over $2 million in the last quarter of 2020 alone, bypassing US government investigators including USAGM's own Office of Human Resources, and called for further investigation of what it termed a gross misuse of taxpayer dollars. The Washington Post later reported a second law firm, Caplin & Drysdale, had also been granted a similar no-bid contract in possible violation of Federal contracting regulations for a total cost of $4 million.

Also on January 19, the last full day of the Trump presidency, Pack named a slate of five directors to head each of the three USAGM boards for RFE/RL, Radio Free Asia and Middle East Broadcasting Networks: conservative radio talk show host Blanquita Cullum, Liberty Counsel officer Johnathan Alexander, former White House staffer Amanda Milius, conservative writer Roger Simon and Center for the National Interest Fellow Christian Whiton.

The following day, Pack resigned at the request of the Biden administration. Shapiro resigned from the Office of Cuba Broadcasting on January 21. Biden named veteran VOA journalist Kelu Chao to replace Pack. Chao in turn dismissed Riley and Robbins from VOA, naming Yolanda Lopez, another VOA veteran, as acting director; Lopez had also been reassigned in the wake of the Pompeo interview. On January 22, the Biden administration fired Victoria Coates and her deputy Robert Greenway from the Middle East Broadcasting Networks, naming Kelley Sullivan as acting head.

Guo Wengui interview
On April 19, 2017, VOA interviewed the Chinese real estate tycoon Guo Wengui in a live broadcast. The whole interview was scheduled for 3 hours. After Guo Wengui alleged to own evidence of corruption among the members of the Politburo Standing Committee of China, the highest political authority of China, the interview was abruptly cut off, after only one hour and seventeen minutes of broadcasting. Guo's allegations involved Fu Zhenhua and Wang Qishan, the latter being a member of the Politburo Standing Committee and the leader of the massive anti-graft movement. It was reported that the Government of China warned VOA's representatives not to interview Guo for his "unsubstantiated allegations". Four members of the U.S. Congress requested the Office of Inspector General to conduct an investigation into this interruption on August 27, 2017. The OIG investigation concluded that the decision to curtail the Guo interview was based solely on journalistic best practices rather than any pressure from the Chinese government.

Another investigation, by Mark Feldstein, Chair of Broadcast Journalism at the University of Maryland, College Park and a journalist with decades of experiences as an award-winning television investigative reporter, concluded that "The failure to comply with leadership's instructions during the Guo interview 'was a colossal and unprecedented violation of journalistic professionalism and broadcast industry standards.'" The report also said that "There had been a grossly negligent approach" to pre-interview vetting and failure to "corroborate the authenticity of Guo's evidence or interview other sources" in violation of industry standards. The interview team apparently "demonstrated greater loyalty to its source than to its employer — at the expense of basic journalistic standards of accuracy, verification, and fairness," the Feldstein report concluded.

Relay station used as a CIA black site
It has been reported that a Voice of America relay station in Udon Thani Province Thailand was used as a CIA black site referred to as "Cat's Eye" or "Detention Site Green".

In different regions

DEEWA Radio's impact 

DEEWA Radio, of the VOA, airs in Pakistan. Although some listeners are suspicious that the program is promoting an American agenda, others claim to be experiencing a positive effect. Some listeners feel that the programs are giving a voice to the voiceless, leading them to a sense of empowerment.

Kurdistan and Iran

VOA's service in Iran has had a negative impact on Kurds and Kurdistan according to the publication, Kurdish Life. They claim that the VOA has exacerbated the conflict between the Talabani and the Barzani. They further claim that the VOA is covering up wrongful imprisonments, wrongful arrests, and the building of extremist mosques. According to the same publication, Kurds are being turned into fanatics, and a new generation of terrorists is forming because of the VOA. They claim the VOA is doing this to help PUK.

China

A study was done on Chinese students in America. It found that through the VOA, they disapproved of the actions of the Chinese government. Another study was done on Chinese scholars in America, and found that the VOA had an effect on their political beliefs. Their political beliefs did not change in relation to China, though, as they did not tend to believe the VOA's reports on China.

Russia 
In response to the request of the United States Department of Justice that RT register as a foreign agent under the Foreign Agents Registration Act, Russia's Justice Ministry Konovalov labeled Voice of America and Radio Free Europe/Radio Liberty as foreign agents in December 2017.

See also
 BBC World Service
 China Media Group
 Deutsche Welle
 France 24
 Frank Shozo Baba
 George Kao
 List of world news channels
 Radio propaganda
 Radio Rebelde
 Telesur
 Voice of America Indonesia
 Voice of Russia

References

Bibliography

External links
 
 

 
Shortwave radio stations in the United States
Peabody Award winners
International broadcasters
Radio organizations in the United States
Organizations established in 1942
Articles containing video clips
United States government propaganda organizations
Mass media companies based in Washington, D.C.
Television channels and stations established in 1942
Democracy promotion
Tibetan-language radio stations
1942 establishments in the United States
Media listed in Russia as foreign agents